Martin Gold may refer to:
 Marty Gold (1915–2011), American composer, pianist and bandleader
 Martin B. Gold (born 1947), American lawyer
 Martin Gold (comedian) (born 1966), British comedian